Niabella soli is a Gram-negative, aerobic and non-motile bacterium from the genus of Niabella which has been isolated from soil from the Jeju Island in Korea.

References

Chitinophagia
Bacteria described in 2008